Christopher George Hawkins (31 August 1938 – 29 December 2022) was an English cricketer.  He was a right-handed batsman who fielded as a wicket-keeper. He was born in Slough, Buckinghamshire.

Hawkins made his debut for Buckinghamshire in the 1955 Minor Counties Championship against Norfolk.  He played Minor counties cricket for Buckinghamshire from 1955 to 1965, making 44 Minor Counties Championship appearances.  Hawkins made his first-class debut for Warwickshire against Cambridge University in 1957.  His next first-class appearance was his only County Championship game, which came against Northamptonshire.  He played two further first-class matches in 1957, against Scotland and the Combined Services.  A specialist wicket-keeper, Hawkins scored just 16 runs in his four first-class matches, with a high score of 11 not out.  He took seven catches and made two stumpings.

References

External links
Christopher Hawkins at ESPNcricinfo

1938 births
2022 deaths
Sportspeople from Slough
English cricketers
Buckinghamshire cricketers
Warwickshire cricketers
Wicket-keepers